Marvin Austin Jr. (born January 10, 1989) is a former American football nose tackle. He played college football at North Carolina and was drafted by the New York Giants in the second round of the 2011 NFL Draft. Austin also played for the Miami Dolphins, Dallas Cowboys and Denver Broncos.

High school career
A native of Washington, D. C., Austin chose to attend Coolidge High School in the Manor Park neighborhood, despite being courted by notable D. C. area athletic programs like DeMatha coming out of middle school. As a junior in 2005, he helped Coolidge to the D. C. Interscholastic Athletic Association title game for the first time since 1986, where they lost 43–14 to a Dunbar team that was led by Arrelious Benn, Nate Bussey, and Vontae Davis. In the spring of 2006, Coolidge assistant Moses Ware was hired as the head coach at his alma mater Ballou High School in Congress Heights, and persuaded a number of rising seniors—including Austin—to leave Coolidge and play for him across town. He led Ballou to their first DCIAA title in 2006, beating Dunbar 34–33. Austin contributed 85 tackles and 17 sacks, and was named High School All-Metro First-team by Washington Post for consecutive times (2005 and 2006). Following his high school career, Austin played in the 2007 U.S. Army All-American Bowl. USA Today named him to their All-American first-team, and also National Defensive Player of the Year.

Regarded as a five-star recruit by Rivals.com, Austin was ranked as the No. 1 defensive tackle in the class of 2007, which also included Brian Price, Drake Nevis, and Star Lotulelei. Austin was ranked third overall in the country in Scout.com's final rankings, behind only Everson Griffen and Joe McKnight. He was recruited by numerous top programs around the country including Florida State, Southern California, and Tennessee.  On National Signing Day 2007, Austin committed to play his collegiate ball at the North Carolina.

College career

In his true freshman year at North Carolina, Austin played in all 12 season games and started in three. He finished the season with 26 tackles, 6.0 tackles for losses, and 4.0 sacks.

In 2008, Austin played in 13 games and started 11. He tied with E.J. Wilson for most tackles by a Carolina defensive lineman with 38, had 1.5 tackles for loss, 1 sack, 1 interception (returned for touchdown), and 1 blocked kick. He had three tackles, assisted on a tackle for loss and had one quarterback pressure in the win over Notre Dame, and earned coaches "player of the game" honors for his performance.

In his junior season, Austin was selected second-team All-ACC. For the season, Austin finished with 42 tackles, 6.0 tackles for losses, four sacks, three pass breakups, six quarterback pressures, one forced fumble and a fumble recovery.

After an excellent junior season, Austin was viewed as a potential top-10 draft pick. However, before he could build on his draft stock, he was suspended along with 13 other North Carolina players for receiving improper benefits. Austin along with Tar Heels pass rusher Robert Quinn, receiver Greg Little and three others were suspended the entire 2010 season. North Carolina still had enough talent to finish 8-5 and beat Tennessee in the Music City Bowl.

Even though he was dismissed from the UNC football team, Austin represented the school in the 2011 East-West Shrine Game on January 22, 2011. He scored a touchdown by recovering a fumble by Texas A&M Aggies' starting quarterback Jerrod Johnson 3 yards out of the endzone.

Austin came under heavy fire in the NFL draft process. Despite having a good East-West Shrine game, his character and judgment came under question to scouts. Reports of his skipping the Wonderlic test and finger-pointing in interviews reportedly disappointed some NFL personnel.

On November 19, 2013, the University of North Carolina sent a disassociation letter to Austin, Greg Little, and Robert Quinn for the improper benefits taken during their time at the university. The three athletes are prohibited from contacting current North Carolina athletes and are not allowed inside the Kenan Football Center or other athletic facilities on campus.

Professional career

New York Giants

In the 2011 NFL Draft Austin was selected 52nd overall by the New York Giants. Giants general manager Jerry Reese stated he consulted Austin's teammate at UNC Hakeem Nicks prior to the selection. Austin said Nicks was the first person to call him after he was drafted. Prior to the draft Austin was heavily scouted by the Chicago Bears. Bears coach Lovie Smith and defensive coordinator Rod Marinelli visited Austin and "spent a goodly amount of time with him."

On August 22, Austin's season was cut short as he tore his pectoral muscle during a preseason game against the Bears. He was placed on injured reserve on August 30.

Most famous for injuring Jet's QB Mark Sanchez in the 4th quarter of a 2013 pre-season game vs. the Jets, that ended Sanchez's career as a Jet.

Austin saw his first appearance come in the Giants' second game of the 2012 NFL season, when the Giants played the Tampa Bay Buccaneers.

Miami Dolphins
He was signed to the Miami Dolphins' roster on September 24, 2013. He was released on October 15, 2013.

Dallas Cowboys
On October 21, 2013, he was signed by the Dallas Cowboys. He made his Cowboys debut in the 30–31 loss to the Detroit Lions in week 8, registering one tackle. Due to a back injury suffered during practice, Austin missed the Cowboys' next game against the Minnesota Vikings, and was cut two days later, on November 5, 2013.

Denver Broncos
Austin signed with the Denver Broncos on May 5, 2014.

References

External links

 
 North Carolina Tar Heels bio

1989 births
Living people
African-American players of American football
Players of American football from Washington, D.C.
American football defensive tackles
North Carolina Tar Heels football players
New York Giants players
Miami Dolphins players
Dallas Cowboys players
Denver Broncos players
21st-century African-American sportspeople
20th-century African-American people